Komu Vnyz is a Ukrainian rock band founded in 1988. Komu Vnyz's music is a blend of gothic and industrial styles, combined with the lyrics of ancient Ukrainian legends.

The band name is a perestroika-era derogatory pun on the word "Communism". It is literally translated as "Who needs to go down".

History 
Komu Vnyz got its start in the year 1988. Unknown young actor Andriy Sereda and educator Volodyslav Makarov worked together in the same theater. Sereda and Makarov joined with three more artists (Serhiy Stepanenko, Yevhen Razin, Volodyslav Maliuhin) to make Komu Vnyz. They wound up at their first festival Chervona Ruta completely by chance. It was too late to submit the sample recording to the panel of judges for the tryout, but Taras Petrynenko, after listening to their work, insisted that they participated in the event. They received second place.

After releasing their first album "Padaya Vverkh" ("Falling Up"), Komu Vnyz and the rest of the Chervona Ruta winners toured in Canada, Poland, and many Ukrainian cities.

From 1996 onward, Komu Vnyz came out from the precipice of financial difficulties. Playbills started to appear on railings and fences in Kyiv for their 1997 concert, in Kastus, named for one of their albums.

In 2000 the band played at Ivan Franko theater, performing a concert dedicated to the memory of 300 young students killed under Kruty. They also headlined at the first Ukrainian gothic festival, "Dity Nochi" ("Children of the Night"), organized by Ukrainian Gothic Portal, and started to work with UGP. In 2002 the band played at the European gothic festival, Wave Gotik Treffen.

In 2003, Makarov left the band. He died in January 2016. As of 2019, the band still continues their activity. Premier Minister of Ukraine, Oleksiy Honcharuk, has even visited "Veterans Strong Party" war-veteran charity concert where the band performed along with others.

Serhiy Stepanenko died on 18 November 2022, at the age of 58.

Discography

Albums 
 1989 - Padaya vverkh (Падая вверх)
 1990 - Komu vnyz (Кому вниз)
 1996 - In kastus

EPs 
 2007 - Ab ovo usque ad mala
 2014 - 4
 2016 - IDEM 2345

Live albums 
 1999 - In kastus in vivo
 2018 - Live at FEST!republic Lviv
 2018 - Live at the Lviv Opera House

Compilations 
 2003 - "Komu Vnyz. Rock legends of Ukraine" ("Best of" collection)
 2006 - "Komu Vnyz. MP3 collection"
 2009 - "Komu Vnyz. Reformatsiya: 25 punktiv" ("Best of" collection)
 2011 - "Ya Vernuvsia Domiv" (Tribute to Braty Hadiukiny)

References

External links
Official Komu Vnyz website
 
 

Musical groups from Kyiv
Soviet rock music groups
Ukrainian rock music groups